Kalkfontein Nature Reserve, is situated in the southernmost part of the Free State, of South Africa, on the road (R701) between Bethulie and Smithfield  about 15 km from Bethulie, where the Orange River and the Caledon River come together.

Wildlife
Include: blesbok, black wildebeest, springbok, eland, grey rhebok, gemsbok, reedbuck, impala, kudu, red hartebeest and zebra, Cape buffalo, southern white rhinoceros and south-central black rhinoceros.

See also
Department: Tourism. 

Nature reserves in South Africa
Protected areas of the Free State (province)